Cow Ark Farmhouse is an historic building in the English parish of Bowland Forest Low, Lancashire. It is Grade II listed, built around 1780, and is a sandstone house with a stone-slate roof, in two storeys and two bays.  It has three-light mullioned windows, and a doorway with a plain surround.

See also
Listed buildings in Bowland Forest Low

References

Notes

18th-century establishments in England
Houses completed in the 18th century
Grade II listed buildings in Lancashire
Houses in Lancashire
Farmhouses in England
Buildings and structures in Ribble Valley